The NMBS-SNCB HLD 50 locomotive was a high-powered testbed locomotive, converted from HLD 201.001 in 1969.

History
NMBS-SNCB wanted to gain experiences with high-powered diesel locomotives, with a possible order following if the tests would prove successful. As locomotive 200.001 was due for a large revision it was decided to rebuild this locomotive with a 4000 hp Cockerill engine. It was planned to give the locomotive the number 200.101, but as the rebuilding took some 2 years and a half, much longer than expected, it was directly given the new number 5001, in line with the large renumbering in 1971.

Apart from the new 16-cylinder engine it was also equipped with electric train heating, which replaced the steam generator.

Career
After the locomotive was converted it was first trialled and put in commercial service. During both trials and commercial service it proved to be very unreliable and was spending more time in workshops than it was running on the track.

In 1976 the trials were stopped as NMBS-SNCB decided that it didn't need a high-power diesel locomotive anymore. Upon this decision it was first stabled at Kinkempois workshops and later at the shed in Latour.

After some time the locomotive was sent to the Salzinnes workshops to be converted back into a standard class 51 locomotive. It received the engine of HLD 5176 which was damaged in an accident, but whose engine was still intact. In 1980 it was back put into service as a standard class 51 locomotive under number 5101.

References

External links 
 
 

National Railway Company of Belgium locomotives
Co′Co′ locomotives
Diesel-electric locomotives of Belgium
Railway locomotives introduced in 1969
Cockerill locomotives
Standard gauge locomotives of Belgium
Co'Co' Diesel Locomotives of Europe